This is list of archives in Germany.

Archives in Germany 
 German Federal Archives
 Barbarastollen underground archive
 Bach-Archiv Leipzig
 Bauhaus Archive
 Berlin Document Center
 Deutsche Kinemathek
 Deutsches Filmarchiv
 Deutsches Literaturarchiv Marbach
 Deutsches Tanzarchiv Köln
 Fritz Reuter Literary Archive
 German Broadcasting Archive
 Historical Archive of the City of Cologne
 Königsberg City Archive
 Prussian Privy State Archives
 Staatliches Filmarchiv der DDR
 Stasi Records Agency
 Tomas Schmit Archiv
 , mostly in Germany. Related to new social movements

Regional archives
 Brandenburgisches Landeshauptarchiv

See also 

 List of archives
 List of museums in Germany
 Culture of Germany

Further reading

External links 

 
Archives
Germany
Archives